Boytronic is a German music group that plays electropop. It was founded in 1983 by Holger Wobker and Peter Sawatzki in Hamburg, Germany as Kapitän Sehnsucht (Captain Desire). The original Boytronic released two synthpop albums: The Working Model (1983) and The Continental (1985). The record company, claiming rights to the band name, put together a completely different line-up in 1986. It was headed by Hayo Lewerentz (Hayo Panarinfo) (U96/Major Records) and continued to record under the Boytronic name until the mid-1990s. In 2002, Boytronic was revived by Wobker from the original group and Panarinfo from the second incarnation. They released the albums Autotunes, Maxi and remastered editions of The Working Model (Reverse) and The Continental (Replace) with bonus tracks. The albums was released on Hayo Lewerentz label Major Records.

Wobker teamed up with his Beachhead bandmate Hans Johm (Antlers Mulm) and Michael Maria Ziffels for the Dependence (2006) album. On this album the song "Forever" from The Continental album, sees its German version as "Für Immer".

The band had three charting singles in Germany. In a 1986 NME interview, Curtis Mantronik said that he had adopted his pseudonym, and the name Mantronix, from an imported recording by this group.

Group members

1982–1985 
 Bryllyant Berger (aka Holger Wobker)
 Peter Sawatzki-Bär 
 Klaus Stockhausen
 Charly Schöppner (had his own band as well: "Electric Theatre")
 Klaus Dufke

1986–1987 
 Hayo Lewerentz (Hayo Panarinfo)
 Bela Lagonda

1987–1993 
 Mark Wade 
 Alberto Hauss (aka Bela Lagonda)
 Hayo Lewerentz

1994–1995 
 Hayo Panarinfo
 Bela Lagonda

2002–2005 
 Holger Wobker
 Hayo Panarinfo

2006 
 Holger Wobker
 Hans Johm (Antlers Mulm)
 Michael Maria Ziffels

2017 
Hayo Lewerentz
Alberto Ingo Hauss
James Knights

2018 
Holger Wobker
James Knights

Discography

Boytronic discovery

Albums
 The Working Model (1983)
 The Continental (1985)
 Love for Sale (1988)
 The Heart And The Machine (1992)
 Autotunes (2002)
 Dependence (November 2006)
 Jewel (2017)
 The Robot Treatment (2019)

Remix albums
 Boyzclub Remixes (1991)
 The Robot The Robot Treatment (Remix Pack Piece Of Entertainment And Dancing Wild For You) (2020)

Re-released albums
 The Working Model – Reverse (bonus tracks) (2003)
 The Continental (The Replace - bonus tracks) (2005)

Unreleased albums
 Blueberry Pancake With Maple Syrup (unreleased) (1986)
 A Feather on the Breath of God (unreleased) (1995)

Compilations
 Maxi (2004)
 The Original Maxi-Singles Collection (2014) 
 The Drama Compilation

Singles Boytronic
 You (1983) GER No. 10
 Diamonds And Loving Arms (1984)
 You (US release) (1984)
 Man In A Uniform (1984)
 Hold On (1984)
 Late Night Satellite (1985)
 Hurts (1986)
 You ('86 release) (1986)
 Bryllyant (1986)
 I Will Survive (1988)
 Tears (1988)
 Don't Let me Down (1988) GER No. 45
 Trigger Track '89 (1989)
 Hold On ('91 release) (1991)
 You ('91 release) (1991)
 Pictures Of You (1992)
 My Baby Lost Her Way (1992)
 Send Me An Angel (1994) GER No. 95
 Blue Velvet (1995)
 Living Without You 1 (2002)
 Living Without You 2 (2002)
 Time After Midnight (2017)
 All You Can Eat (2019)

As KAMERATA - Holger Wobker, Ralf Martens

Album
 Lovers & Other Strangers (1988)

Singles
 Charlotte (1987) 
 Heroin (1987)
 Horseback (1988)

As BEACHHEAD- Holger Wobker, Hans Johm 
 Drowning Tonight (2006)

See also 
 U96

References

External links 
 
 
 Boytronic biography

German synthpop groups
Musical groups from Hamburg
Musical groups established in 1983